It's All Right! is an album by jazz pianist Wynton Kelly released on the Verve label featuring performances by Kelly with Paul Chambers and Jimmy Cobb with Kenny Burrell and Candido Camero recorded in 1964. Original recording was produced by Creed Taylor.

Reception
The Allmusic review by Scott Yanow awarded the album 3 stars, stating: "The music is essentially easy listening jazz with concise versions of ten numbers... overall, this effort is not too essential.

Track listing
 "It's All Right" (Curtis Mayfield) - 2:51  
 "South Seas" (Rudy Stevenson) - 5:30  
 "Not a Tear" (Stevenson) - 5:59  
 "Portrait of Jennie" (Gordon Burdge, J. Russel Robinson) - 4:37  
 "Kelly Roll" (Kenny Burrell) - 3:52  
 "The Fall of Love" [From The Fall of the Roman Empire]  (Dimitri Tiomkin, Ned Washington) - 2:06  
 "Moving Up" (Wynton Kelly) - 3:53  
 "On the Trail" [From the Grand Canyon Suite] (Ferde Grofé) - 4:31  
 "Escapade" (Andy Badalele, Morton Wax) - 2:57  
 "One for Joan" (Charles Lloyd) - 3:11 Bonus track on CD
Recorded at the Webster Hall in New York City on March 10 (tracks 2, 3 & 6), March 11 (track 1) and March 19 (tracks 4, 5 & 7-10)

Personnel
Wynton Kelly - piano
Kenny Burrell - guitar (tracks 1-3 & 5-10)
Paul Chambers - bass
Jimmy Cobb - drums
Candido Camero - conga (tracks 1-5 & 7-10)
The Tommy Rey Caribe Steel Band: Tommy Reynolds, Ralph Cowley, Hiram Delgado, Malcolm Evans, Norman Symonds - steel percussion and Donald Usher - maracas (track 6)

References

1964 albums
Verve Records albums
Wynton Kelly albums
albums produced by Creed Taylor